The Stolp Starduster Too SA300 is a two-seat, conventional landing gear equipped, homebuilt biplane. Aircraft Spruce & Specialty Co currently holds rights to sell plans for the aircraft.

Design and development
The Starduster Too was developed to be an economical two-seat sport biplane. The airplane is designed to plus 6 or minus 6 G loading. It was not intended for use in aerobatic competition, but it can perform basic aerobatics.

The fuselage is made of 4130 steel tubing with fabric covering. The spars are made of spruce wood with plywood wooden wing ribs. The base engine is a Lycoming O-360  engine, but alternative examples  have been built using the Lycoming IO-540, Ranger, Ford V-8 and V-6, Continental, Jacobs, and even Pratt & Whitney R-985 engines.

Operational history
The Starduster Too is a popular biplane homebuilt design. There are several with over 2500 hours of flight time, and one with over 5000 hours.

Variants
The Stolp Acroduster, and Stolp Acroduster Too, were the follow on models to the Starduster. They were scaled down 10 percent, and stressed to 9g. The first example was registered as a Schrack-Stolp Super Starduster Too.

One example of a Starduster Too was modified with retractable gear and a sliding canopy. The aircraft named "Samsong" was able to cruise at 150 mph, and had an 830-mile range with 45 gallons of fuel using modified gear legs from a Cessna 140

Specifications Starduster Too

See also

References

Taylor, John W. R. Jane's All The World's Aircraft 1966–67. London:Sampson Low, Marston & Company, 1966.
 Taylor, John W. R. Jane's All The World's Aircraft 1988–89. Coulsdon, UK: Jane's Defence Data, 1988. .

External links

Photo of Starduster too
Airventure museum

Homebuilt aircraft
Biplanes
Aerobatic aircraft
Single-engined tractor aircraft